Mikhail Fradkov's First Cabinet (March - May 2004) was a cabinet of the government of the Russian Federation during the presidential election of 2004, preceded by the cabinet of Mikhail Kasyanov, who had been dismissed by President Vladimir Putin on February 24, 2004, and followed by Mikhail Fradkov's Second Cabinet immediately after Vladimir Putin's second inauguration. 

It was led by Prime Minister Mikhail Fradkov, proposed by President Vladimir Putin for the approval by the State Duma on March 1, 2004. On March 5 Fradkov was approved by the State Duma and appointed Prime Minister by the President. Other 16 ministers of the cabinet were appointed by presidential decrees on March 9. Seven of the ministers occupied the same positions in Mikhail Kasyanov's Government: Yury Chaika, Alexey Gordeyev, German Gref, Sergei Ivanov, Viktor Khristenko, Alexey Kudrin, and Sergei Shoigu. The cabinet underwent no reshuffles and resigned on May 7. It was a temporary cabinet, as Russian legislation stipulates that a new government has to be formed in the beginning of a new presidential term, so the ministers remained acting and were reappointed with minor changes as Mikhail Fradkov's Second Cabinet few days later.

Members

|}

References

External links
Fradkov's First Cabinet, Politika.su (in Russian).

Fradkov
2004 establishments in Russia
2004 disestablishments in Russia
Cabinets established in 2004
Cabinets disestablished in 2004